Einzug ins Paradies was a six-part East German television series, which dealt with the lives of five families who moved into a newly constructed apartment building.

See also
List of German television series

External links
 

1987 German television series debuts
1987 German television series endings
German-language television shows
Television shows set in Berlin
Television in East Germany